Battle of Arrapha took place in 616 BC between Assyrian forces against the Babylonians and Medes .
Babylonian king Nabopolassar with the help of other rebellion forces succeeded by driving the Assyrians back to the Little Zab, in doing so capturing many Assyrian armoury, horses, and chariots.
The next year, Cyaxares, king of the Medes and Nabopolassar, King of Babylon went to battle the Assyrians and attempted to conquer Arrapha.

Notes

Arrapha
Arrapha
Arrapha
7th century BC
616 BC
615 BC
Arrapha